The Album is the debut studio album from Australian comedy group Aunty Donna. It also served as the group's sixth webseries, with music videos being made for eight of the album's 16 tracks and uploaded to the group's YouTube channel. The album features guest appearances from comedians Demi Lardner, Michelle Brasier, Hamish Blake and Matt Okine; in addition to Australian pop singer Montaigne and King Gizzard & the Lizard Wizard guitarist Joey Walker.

The album and accompanying web series were announced with the release of a trailer on 4 February 2018. The first single, "Chuffed (Dad Song)," was released four days later. The final single and video was "(Walking in on Someone) Doin' a Poo," which was released one week after The Album was released. The Album debuted at number 30 in the ARIA Albums Chart, as well as number 7 in the Australian Artist Albums chart. 

At the ARIA Music Awards of 2018, the album was nominated for ARIA Award for Best Comedy Release.

Track listing

Personnel
Broden Kelly – vocals 
Mark Samual Bonnano – vocals 
Zachary Ruane – vocals 
Tom Armstrong – production, beats 
Alex Pizzol – guitar, bass 
Michelle Brasier – vocals 
Demi Lardner – vocals 
Sammy J – vocals 
Joey Walker – guitar 
Montaigne – vocals 
Matt Okine – vocals 
Hamish Blake – vocals 
SUB-Human – production, beats 
Joe Kosky – vocals 
Klaus Hill – mixing, mastering

Charts

References

2018 debut albums
Aunty Donna albums